Bankwest is an Australian full-service bank based in Perth, Western Australia. It was sold in October 2008 to the Commonwealth Bank of Australia for 2.1 billion and operates as a division of its parent company.

Bankwest previously had branches in Adelaide, Brisbane, Canberra, Melbourne and Sydney.

History 
In 1895, the Government of Western Australia established the Agricultural Bank of Western Australia as a rural lender to support the State's farming industries. Despite its name, it was technically not a bank, in that it did not collect deposits from the public, its liabilities being government bonds. It was a government instrumentality that lent exclusively to farmers. 

In May 1916, the Agricultural Bank changed its name to the Rural and Industries Bank of Western Australia (also known as R&I Bank). In 1945, the Agricultural Bank became a full trading bank. This enabled it to expand its retail and commercial banking services throughout the state. In 1956 it became a savings bank, and in 1985 the first Sydney branch opened.  The bank was incorporated in 1990, and then in 1994 changed its name to the Bank of Western Australia Limited, with the trading name Bankwest, in preparation for privatisation. In December 1995, the Bank of Scotland acquired the bank, and as part of the sale agreement, offered 49 per cent of the shares in Bankwest to the public.  Bankwest shares listed on the Australian Stock Exchange on 1 February 1996.

In 2001, Halifax Group (a large UK financial institution) merged with Bank of Scotland to form HBOS plc.  HBOS then acquired all the outstanding shares of Bankwest, making it HBOS's wholly owned subsidiary.

In 2003, Bankwest announced the acquisition of API Finance from Australian Pharmaceutical Industries Ltd (API) for $300m in line with its industry specialisation growth strategy in the business banking segment.

Late in 2006, Bankwest announced it would be leaving their landmark tower, in favour of a new complex at Raine Square.

In early June 2008, reports began to circulate that HBOS intended to sell Bankwest. In September 2008, Lloyds TSB bought HBOS in a deal worth over £12.2 billion. This was followed in October 2008 when, with significant problems of their own, HBOS/Lloyds TSB agreed to the sale of Bankwest and St Andrews Insurances to Commonwealth Bank of Australia (CBA) for an initial purchase price of 2.1 billion.

After lengthy delays, the bank moved their headquarters in September 2012 to a new office building in the Raine Square complex called Bankwest Place.

Products and services
Bankwest offers a full range of banking products, including loans (home loans, car credits, personal loans), credit cards transaction and savings accounts.

In 2007, Bankwest launched the Bankwest Regular Saver account for individuals.

In 2012 Bankwest launched the Student Edge debit card linked to their Student account.

In 2016, Bankwest terminated its share trading platform and all Bankwest online share trading accounts were closed on 31 May 2016.

In February 2022, Bankwest announced it would stop offering business products and services and eventually shift existing business customers to Commonwealth Bank.

Branch closures 
On 18 July 2018, Bankwest announced plans to close 29 branches in New South Wales, Victoria and Queensland from 17 August to 7 September. Bankwest managing director Rowan Munchenberg said an overwhelming number of its customers were choosing to bank online, prompting the closure of the stores.

In October 2022, Bankwest closed all its east coast branches. This was due to the majority of customers using digital channels to conduct their banking. The closures were also caused by a large decrease in the number of transactions being conducted in branch.

Controversies 
In December 2011, a former Bankwest commercial client Geoff Shannon started an action group and website called "Unhappy Banking", after losing "all of [his] company and personal assets due to the predatory conduct of Bankwest". The group claimed that Bankwest "moved aggressively to reduce its exposure to small- and medium-sized commercial property clients" after being taken over by the Commonwealth Bank in 2008. After lobbying by Unhappy Banking, a Senate Inquiry was announced into banking practices on 14 March 2012. In August 2013 Shannon lost his case against Bankwest, with Supreme Court Judge Sackar referring to Shannon as an "unreliable witness".

Shannon was also a discussed as a person of interest at the 2017 Primary Lending Senate Inquiry by Nationals Senator John Williams, stating "[bank customers] are in a desperate situation, so they put their faith in some of these people like ... Mr Shannon, and it all ends in tears". In 2015, The Weekly Times investigated Shannon for allegedly misrepresenting himself as a staff member of a law firm.

See also 

 Banking in Australia
 List of banks in Australia
 Timeline of banking in Western Australia

Sources 
 Spillman, Ken (1989) Horizons: A History of the Rural and Industries Bank of Western Australia. (Perth: University of Western Australia Press.)

References

External links 
 
 

1895 establishments in Australia
Banks established in 1895
Banks of Australia
Companies based in Perth, Western Australia
Former government-owned companies of Western Australia
Commonwealth Bank